Gregory Doc Rossi known professionally as Doc Rossi, is a citternist, composer and scholar born in Dayton, Ohio in 1955, emigrating to Europe in 1984. Today, he lives in Portugal after spending some years in Italy and Corsica. He studied music from an early age and began performing at 14. He has B.A.s in Music and English Literature, and was awarded the Ph.D. in 1991 from the University of London, where he wrote on Shakespeare and Brecht under the supervision of René Weis and Keith Walker. He studied historical technique with Andrea Damiani and has had tuition from John Renbourn, Ugo Orlandi, Richard Strasser, Christopher Morrongiello, Ljubo Majstorovic and John Anthony Lennon.
Rossi has had a lifelong interest in the cittern, having built one at the age of 13. He now performs on a variety of instruments, including the diatonic Renaissance cittern, the modern Celtic cittern, the Corsican cetera, and especially the so-called English guittar (sic) or cetra, an 18th-century instrument. He also plays fingerstyle guitar, bass guitar, tenor banjo, and mandolin family instruments.

His recordings include Six Sonatas for Cetra or Kitara by Pasqualini Demarzi with Andrea Damiani, and La Cetra Galant, a CD of solos and duets, and Contradanses of Robert Daubat. His publications include The Celtic Cittern, The Celtic Guitar, Irish Guitar ASAP and Irish Mandolin ASAP for Centerstream/Hal Leonard; The Compleat Cittern, a tutor for 18th-century cittern (with transcriptions for guitar and other six-course instruments), the English translation of Andrea Damiani’s Tutor for Renaissance Lute, a modern edition of Thomas Robinson’s cittern music including New Citharen Lessons (1609) and pieces from manuscript sources, and The Original Guitar Styles of Jerry Donahue. He has published articles dealing with guitar and cittern history, Shakespeare and Brecht, Scott Fitzgerald, and the Beat Generation.

Doc Rossi is a founder of The Cittern Society.

In 2005, 2007, 2009 and 2011, Rossi conducted lectures on different playing techniques at the Waldzither-conference at Suhl in Thuringia, Germany, where he was invited as a specialist to revive the German cittern.

References

External links
 https://soundcloud.com/g-doc-rossi
 https://www.linkedin.com/in/doc-rossi-b23b47a/

1955 births
Living people
Alumni of University College London
American classical guitarists
Citternists
String musicians
20th-century American guitarists